Tayce Szura-Radix (born 28 May 1994) is a Welsh drag queen, rapper, and model from Newport, Wales. She is best known for competing in the second series of RuPaul's Drag Race UK, where she was placed as a runner-up.

Career
Tayce has professionally fulfilled her career as a drag queen since 2017 and started her career performing in Revolution Newport, a vodka bar. Tayce cites performers such as Beyoncé, Ciara, and Jennifer Lopez as her inspiration when in drag. In January 2020, Tayce attended the first ever RuPaul's DragCon UK and performed alongside Shea Couleé and Ore-Ho on the main stage.

In December 2020, Tayce was announced as one of twelve contestants competing on the second series of RuPaul's Drag Race UK. Tayce won the main challenge in Episode 5 "The RuRuvision Song Contest" (alongside A'Whora, Bimini Bon-Boulash and Lawrence Chaney) winning a RuPeter badge, however, she was in the bottom 2 four times as well as winning her first three lip-syncs and sending home Cherry Valentine, Sister Sister and A'Whora. Her fourth lip-sync against Ellie Diamond was declared a "double-shantay" with both queens advancing to the finale, and neither being eliminated. Tayce is the first ever queen on RuPaul's Drag Race UK series to survive four lip-syncs and win three of them, and was dubbed by fans as a "lip-sync assassin". She made it top 3 of RuPaul's Drag Race UK, but lost the Lip-Sync For The Crown to Lawrence Chaney placing as joint runner-up alongside Bimini Bon-Boulash.

Tayce frequently performs at nightclubs, predominantly in London.
In March 2021, Tayce, alongside fellow RuPaul's Drag Race UK finalists, was photographed and interviewed for The Guardian and later British Vogue. In May 2021, she was a featured performer at Drive Time Drag, a first of its kind in the UK drag drive-in show. Tayce embarked on a sold out UK Tour alongside A'Whora, Bimini Bon-Boulash and Lawrence Chaney for the United Kingdolls Tour with promoter Klub Kids in July 2021, and in February 2022 Tayce embarked on the RuPaul's Drag Race UK: The Official Tour alongside the entire cast of the second series of RuPaul's Drag Race UK, in association with World of Wonder and promoter Voss Events.

In March 2021, Tayce was announced as an ambassador for Coca-Cola's "Open That Cola!" campaign in the United Kingdom. As of June 2021, she is the second most followed drag queen on Instagram, within the Drag Race UK franchise.

In April 2021, Tayce was interviewed for and featured on the cover of Attitude'''s "Tea Time digital special". Later that month, she, alongside fellow Drag Race contestant A'Whora, co-launched The Bluebella Pride, a lingerie line, calling for the abolition of anti-gay laws in 35 Commonwealth nations.

In June 2021, Tayce partnered with Boohoo owned fashion brand Nasty Gal for a 60-piece gender neutral capsule collection.

As a model, Tayce is currently signed with Models 1 modelling agency as both their in-drag and out of drag persona. She has recently attended and modelled in both London and Paris fashion weeks. She has also modelled in two Jean Paul Gaultier fragrance campaigns. 

Preceding RuPaul's Drag Race UK, Tayce has been a frequent collaborator with the BBC (especially BBC Radio 1 and BBC Sounds). In August 2021, she presented the Saturday breakfast show slot on BBC Radio 1 from 9:30am, alongside Clara Amfo, as part of Drag Day also featuring Tayce's fellow Series 2 contestants: Bimini Bon-Boulash and Lawrence Chaney, as well as DJ Jodie Harsh. Tayce has also presented a mindfulness-based programme in collaboration with BBC Radio 1 Relax (a BBC Sounds exclusive subsidiary of BBC Radio 1).

Personal life
Tayce's father is Roger Radix, a former bass guitarist for Wham!She currently resides in Streatham in South London, England and formerly lived with fellow RuPaul's Drag Race UK contestant A'Whora. On episode eight of RuPaul's Drag Race UK'', Tayce opened up about how being diagnosed with chlamydia and gonorrhea at the age of 18 damaged her self-esteem, and altered her feelings towards relationships due to emotions of shame and guilt. Tayce's openness when discussing this experience was commended for breaking stigmas around sexually transmitted infections, including by British charity the Terrence Higgins Trust. Tayce is gay, and uses she/her pronouns while in drag, and he/him pronouns while out of drag.

Filmography

Television

Music videos

Radio

Web series

Discography

As featured artist

Stage

Notes

References

External links

 

1994 births
Living people
20th-century Welsh LGBT people
21st-century Welsh LGBT people
Gay entertainers
LGBT Black British people
RuPaul's Drag Race UK contestants
Welsh drag queens